Mates condoms are a brand of condom sold in the UK.

History
The brand was launched in the UK in 1987 by Richard Branson, with its condoms intended as a low cost alternative to more expensive brands. In November 1987 the company aired the first condom advert on British television.

In 1988, a year after launch, Richard Branson sold the company and brand to Ansell for 1 million pounds. The condom division in Ansell, of which Mates was a part, was sold in 2017 to Humanwell Healthcare Group and CITIC Capital China Partners for 600 million dollars.

Structure
For many years the company in the UK was operated from Staffordshire, between the A51 and the West Coast Main Line, having relocated from South Elmsall in West Yorkshire.

See also
 History of condoms

References

External links
 

Condom brands
British brands
Companies based in Staffordshire
British companies established in 1987